The 2014–15 Western Football League season (known as the 2014–15 Toolstation Western Football League for sponsorship reasons) is the 113th in the history of the Western Football League, a football competition in England. Teams are divided into two divisions; the Premier and the First.

The league champions for the first time in their history were Melksham Town. Slimbridge finished in a promotion position and were promoted to the Southern League. The champions of Division One were Barnstaple Town.

Premier Division
The Premier Division features two new clubs in a league of 19, reduced from 21 after the promotion of Larkhall Athletic to the Southern League, and the relegation of Hengrove Athletic and Radstock Town to the First Division. Ilfracombe Town also left, resigning from the league shortly before the start of the season:
Bradford Town, champions of Division One.
Shepton Mallet, runners-up in Division One.

Exmouth Town finished runners-up in the South West Peninsula League but were refused promotion due to ground grading issues.

The following clubs applied for promotion to Step 4: Brislington, Bristol Manor Farm, Melksham Town and Slimbridge. Melksham Town's new stadium was not ready and their existing stadium failed the ground grading.

League table

Locations

Results

First Division
The First Division features two new clubs in a league of 22, after the promotion of Bradford Town and Shepton Mallet to the Premier Division:
Hengrove Athletic, relegated from the Premier Division.
Radstock Town, relegated from the Premier Division.

League table

Locations

Results

References
 League tables

External links
 Western League Official Site

2014-15
9